The Seton Hall Pirates men's soccer team represents Seton Hall University in all NCAA Division I men's college soccer competitions. The program was founded in 1928, and currently competes in the Big East Conference. Seton Hall is currently coached by Andreas Lindberg and play their home matches at Owen T. Carroll Field in South Orange, New Jersey.

Team honors

Conference championships 
Big East Conference Men's Soccer Tournament (5): 1986, 1987, 1988, 1990, 1992, 2020
Big East Conference Men's Soccer Regular Season (5): 1986, 1987, 1988, 1989, 1991

Records

Coaching records

Single-season records
Statistics below show the all-time program leaders.

 All-Time record:  449–476–47 (Through 2017 season)

NCAA Tournament history 
Seton Hall has appeared in 12 NCAA Tournaments. Their most recent performance came in 2020. Their combined NCAA record is 5–11–1.

References

External links 
 

 
1928 establishments in New Jersey
Association football clubs established in 1928